

This is a list of the National Register of Historic Places listings in Hanson County, South Dakota.

This is intended to be a complete list of the properties on the National Register of Historic Places in Hanson County, South Dakota, United States. The locations of National Register properties for which the latitude and longitude coordinates are included below, may be seen in a map.

There are 6 properties listed on the National Register in the county, including 1 National Historic Landmark.  Another property was once listed but has since been removed.

Current listings

|}

Former listing

|}

See also
 List of National Historic Landmarks in South Dakota
 National Register of Historic Places listings in South Dakota

References

 
Hanson County